1987 is an album by Swedish band Fibes, Oh Fibes! released in 2009 which was collaborated with Gary Kemp, Pontus Winnberg, Petter Winberg and Oskar Linnros. The album also contains duets with Björn Skifs and Kim Wilde. The album won "Pop Album of the Year" at the 2010 Grammis Awards.

Track listing
"Dubious" - 3:29
"Love Child" - 3:21
"Silly Lover" -3:48
"New York City" - 5:06
"Love Will Always Find a Way" - 4:06
"Run to You" (duet with Kim Wilde) - 3:29
"My Calendar" (featuring Björn Skifs) - 4:05
"Stuck on You" - 3:11
"I Think I Blew It Again" - 3:30
"Goodbye Sunshine" - 2:42

2009 albums
Fibes, Oh Fibes! albums
Blue-eyed soul albums
Universal Music Group albums